Atta is a genus of New World ants of the subfamily Myrmicinae. It contains at least 17 known species.

Atta leaf-cutter ants are relatively large, rusty red or brown in colour, and have a spiny body and long legs. The three main castes within a nest are the queen, worker, and soldier. Only the queens and males have wings (alate), and these ants are also known as reproductives or swarmers. Although most of the ants in the nest are female, only the queens produce eggs.

Overview
Ants of the genus Atta are leafcutter ants that comprise one of the two genera of leafcutting ants within the tribe Attini, along with Acromyrmex. They have no sting,  thus inject no venom, although they are known as strong biters.

Atta spp. exhibit a high degree of polymorphism, with four castes being present in established colonies: minims (or garden ants), minors, mediae, and majors (also called soldiers or dinergates). Their immature development undergoes four larval stages, regardless of the ultimate caste, wherein larvae are also associated with fungal hyphae.

The high degree of polymorphism in this genus is also suggestive of its high degree of advancement. Every caste has a specific function, and some remarkably advanced phenomena have been observed in Atta species. An example of such is the behaviour of the minim ants, which climb on the cut sections of leaf while they are carried back to the nest by the media workers to protect the latter from a particular species of phorid fly that parasitises the leaf-carrying caste. While hitchhiking, the minims also work to decontaminate the fragment before it arrives at the nest, and feed on the sap of the leaf. The minims behaving this way demonstrates the highly derived character of the species. 

Like Acromyrmex, Atta spp. subsist mostly on a particular species of fungus that they cultivate on a medium of masticated leaf tissue. This is the sole food of the queen and other colony members that remain in the nest. The media workers also gain subsistence from plant sap they ingest while physically cutting out sections of leaf from a variety of plants.

Before leaving their parent colonies, winged females carry a small section of fungus in their intrabuccal pocket, and with this, the subsequently wingless queens seed the fungus gardens of incipient colonies. The queen does not eat from the fungus initially; she gives it time to grow by fertilizing it with her fecal matter. She survives on her fat body reserves, eating 90% of the eggs she lays, and catabolizing her wing muscles. Swanson et al 2019 finds annual turnover of Atta nest sites to be between 1127%.

Atta spp. have evolved to change food plants constantly, preventing a colony from completely stripping off leaves and thereby killing trees, thus avoiding negative biological feedback on account of their sheer numbers. This does not diminish the huge quantities of foliage they harvest; Atta is estimated to be responsible for the decomposition of 20% of all leaves in South America. Consequently, the genus is considered a major agricultural pest species in areas where its range coincides with farming activity.

Workers of the genus have few cuticular bacteria.

Evolution
The leafcutter ants (Atta and Acromyrmex) are different from other ants by their underground fungi cultivation; the two genera split off from a common ancestor species about 10 million years ago (Mya). The Trachymyrmex group and Sericomyrmex are the closest relatives to the leafcutters; they split off about 17 Mya. Leafcutter ants are very specialized organisms in that they coevolved with another organism through symbiosis. This process took millions of years to occur, about 50 Mya, which is when these ants began their relationship with fungi. The fungus eventually lost the ability to produce spores and the ants capitalized on that by making the fungus its main food source. About 66 Mya, South America was isolated from other land masses, and this is when gardening ants started their relationship with a fungus. Leafcutter ants are thought to have propagated the same fungal lineage for 25 million years, which means they caused the fungus to reproduce.

Ecological effects
Leafcutter ants can create bottom-up gaps by forming their large nests. The ants excavate soil rich in organic matter, and store additional organic matter in their underground chambers. This creates rich soils that promote plant growth. The ants can also trim the leaves of plants in the understory, allowing for more light to hit the forest floor. They can also control the types of trees and other plants by selectively bringing seeds into the underground chambers. Depending on the location of the chamber, a seed can grow by reaching light.

Species

Atta bisphaerica Forel, 1908
Atta capiguara Gonçalves, 1944
Atta cephalotes (Linnaeus, 1758)
Atta colombica Guérin-Méneville, 1844
Atta cubana Fontenla Rizo, 1995
Atta goiana Gonçalves, 1942
Atta insularis Guérin-Méneville, 1844
Atta laevigata (F. Smith, 1858) (Colombia south to Paraguay)
Atta mexicana (Smith, 1858)
Atta opaciceps Borgmeier, 1939
Atta pilosa (Buckley, 1866)
Atta robusta Borgmeier, 1939
Atta saltensis Forel, 1913
Atta sexdens (Linnaeus, 1758)
Atta tardigrada (Buckley, 1866)
Atta texana (Buckley, 1860) - Texas leafcutter ant (East Texas and western Louisiana in the United States, northeastern Mexico)
Atta vollenweideri Forel, 1893

Uses

As food

Atta species are a popular ingredient in Mexican cuisine, particularly in the southern states such as Chiapas, Guerrero, Hidalgo, Puebla, Veracruz, and Oaxaca. It is considered a delicacy, as well as a food of high protein content, so is often served as a main dish, not as garnish, despite its small portions. They may be eaten as the sole filling in tacos. Atta, the type of ant most eaten in Mexico, has a nutty flavor.

Also in Brazil, the queens of leafcutter ants (locally known as tanajuras) are highly appreciated as delicacies in several regions. The techniques involving their capture and cooking are considered an immaterial patrimony of the people of the Tianguá municipality, in Ceará.

Atta spp. are also eaten by the Guanes tribe.

Cultural references
Princess Atta from A Bug's Life was named after the genus Atta, the species group of leafcutter ant.

See also
List of leafcutter ants

References

External links

BBC archive video of Atta Leaf-cutter ants
Bristol Zoo factsheet

 
Mexican cuisine
Ant genera
Taxa named by Johan Christian Fabricius